World Wide Technology Soccer Park is a soccer complex which includes four soccer-specific stadiums, with the main field, West Community Stadium, holding 5,500 seats. Located in Fenton, Missouri, a suburb southwest of downtown St. Louis, it is operated by St. Louis Scott Gallagher Soccer Club whose 275 teams and 3,600 players use it for both practice and games. It is also the home field for Webster University's men's and women's soccer teams and was the home of Saint Louis FC from 2015-2020. The complex has five playing fields—three turf and two grass—and one main exhibition turf field, most of which are lighted. The fields are primarily used for soccer but also host field hockey and lacrosse teams. In addition to the playing surfaces, the complex features offices, home and away locker rooms, a fan shop, a banquet hall, a veranda overlooking the main field, two concession stands, a press box, and a private office.

History

Opening and Anheuser-Busch
The St. Louis Soccer Park opened in 1982 with funding from Anheuser-Busch who outright purchased it in 1985 and renamed it the Anheuser-Busch Center. During the Anheuser-Busch ownership, the main exhibition field, known as West Community Stadium since August 2019, was opened and capable of seating 5,500 spectators, for hosting international, collegiate and youth soccer competitions.

August Busch IV, the former CEO of Anheuser-Busch, who disliked going to Anheuser-Busch's headquarters, renovated a portion of the Soccer Park offices complete with his own luxurious and secluded office that includes a private bathroom (formerly soccer club coaches offices with a shower) and conference room. During Anheuser-Busch's takeover by Belgium beer maker InBev, the board and executives of Anheuser-Busch met in August's conference room at the Soccer Park. At one point during the takeover proceedings, August said "My war room is the Soccer Park" describing the frantic effort of the executives to save Anheuser-Busch from being sold.

St. Louis Soccer United
In March 2009, Anheuser-Busch wrote a letter of intent to transfer ownership of Soccer Park to Jeff Cooper and his organization St. Louis Soccer United (SLSU) in order to strengthen SLSU's bid for a Major League Soccer expansion team.  While the MLS bid failed, SLSU announced in May that Saint Louis Athletica, the Women's Professional Soccer team also run by SLSU, would play the rest of their home games at Soccer Park, having previously played at Ralph Korte Stadium on the campus of SIUE. In the summer of 2011, Jeff Cooper and SLSU sold the soccer park to St. Louis Scott Gallagher, a local soccer club. Jeff Cooper originally received a bid for the Soccer Park from a non-soccer organization but this news spread to World Wide Technology executives Jim Kavanaugh and Tom Strunk who, in an effort to keep soccer strong in St. Louis, personally financed the deal - estimated at $1.9 million - on behalf of St. Louis Scott Gallagher.

Current ownership
In March 2012, St. Louis Scott Gallagher broke ground on a $1.5 million renovation after it signed a partnership with Webster University and received sponsorship from Nike, Windows Mobile and Wells Fargo in addition to a considerable donation from World Wide Technology, who had a number of executives play soccer at SLU. The renovations included replacing the main exhibition field and another grass field with turf, replanting the two remaining grass fields with Bermuda grass, replacing the out dated scoreboard with a state-of-the-art video board and sound system, and converting one of the coaches' conference rooms into a first-class Team Pro Shop.

International games

See also
 Soccer in St. Louis

References

External links
Official Site

Sports venues completed in 1982
Sports venues in St. Louis
Soccer venues in Missouri
1982 establishments in Missouri
Field hockey venues in the United States
Former Major League Lacrosse venues
Lacrosse venues in the United States
USL Championship stadiums
Sports complexes in the United States
Sports venues in Missouri